Washington, D.C. (officially the District of Columbia), is the capital city and federal district of the United States. Below is a list of Washington, D.C.-related articles.

0–9

A

B

C

D

E

F

G

H

I

J

K

L

M

N

O

P

Q

R

S

T

U

V

W

X

Y

Z

See also

Outline of Washington, D.C.

 
District of Columbia